Haidar Abdul-Amir Hussain (born 2 November 1982) is a former Iraqi football defender. He last played for the Al-Zawraa football club in Iraq, and was known as one of the calmest players in Iraq.

Information
Haidar Abdul Amer played four matches in the 2004 AFC Asian Cup and his solid defending ensured a move from 11-time Iraq league champions Al Zawra’a to Jordan's Al Faisaly at the start of the 2006/07 season. He led the 30-time Jordan league champions to their second consecutive AFC Cup title in November 2006, scoring a vital goal in the second leg of the final against Muharraq.

International goals
Scores and results list Iraq's goal tally first.

Coaching career

Al-Zawraa SC
On 24 February 2019, Hakeem Shaker agreed with Al-Zawraa SC to lead the club, and took Haider Abdul Amer as an assistant coach.

Zakho SC
On 30 October 2022, Haidar Abdul-Amir became the team's coach after Hamza Hadi resigned as Zakho SC coach because of his bad results.
 This was the first time in his sports life that Haider became the main coach of a team.

Managerial statistics

Honours

Club 
Al-Zawraa
Iraqi Premier League: 1999–2000, 2000–01, 2005–06, 2015–16, 2017–18
Iraq FA Cup: 2016–17
Iraqi Super Cup: 2017
Al-Faisaly
AFC Cup: 2006

Country 
 4th place in 2004 Athens Olympics
 2005 West Asian Games Gold medallist.
 2007 Asian Cup winner

References

External links

Living people
Iraqi footballers
Iraq international footballers
Footballers at the 2004 Summer Olympics
Olympic footballers of Iraq
2004 AFC Asian Cup players
2007 AFC Asian Cup players
AFC Asian Cup-winning players
Al-Zawraa SC players
Iraqi expatriate footballers
Expatriate footballers in Jordan
Al-Faisaly SC players
Al-Shorta SC players
Al-Talaba SC players
Shabab Al-Ordon Club players
erbil SC players
1982 births
Association football fullbacks